Bamber Gascoyne may refer to:

Bamber Gascoyne (the elder) (1725–1791), British MP for Maldon, Bossiney, Midhurst, Weobley and Truro
Bamber Gascoyne (the younger) (1758–1824), British MP for Liverpool

See also
Bamber Gascoigne (1935–2022), British television presenter and author